Gadaladeniya  is a village in Sri Lanka. It is located within Central Province.

See also
List of towns in Central Province, Sri Lanka

External links

The Gadaladeniya Temple, with an ancient monastery

Populated places in Kandy District